Wünschendorf may refer to the following places:

In Austria
A part of Hofstätten an der Raab, in Styria

In Germany
Wünschendorf/Elster, a municipality in Thuringia
A locality of Dürrröhrsdorf-Dittersbach, in Saxony
A locality of Pockau-Lengefeld, in Saxony